Eva Katherine Clapp (August 10, 1857 – March 6, 1916) was an American writer of novels, short stories, and poems. She was involved in the deadly Iroquois Theatre fire in 1903. She published a book with a Wizard of Oz inspired plot.

Early years and education
Clapp was born in Bradford, Illinois, August 10, 1857. Her father removed from Western Massachusetts and purchased a section of the best farming land in the state. There, he built a log house and his children were born here. Clapp's paternal grandmother was Lucy Lee, who was a direct descendant, on her father's side, from Pocahontas. Her mother was Ann Ely, from Litchfield, Connecticut, a direct descendant from Lady Alice Fenwick, a romantic figure in colonial times, of Old Lyme, Connecticut. Clapp passed the first 11 years of her life on her father's farm. After her mother's death, when she was 11, she lived with a married sister. She attended school at Amboy, Illinois, at the Dover Academy, and subsequently at the Milwaukee Female College. When she was about 16 years, she visited for a time in the large eastern cities, and subsequently taught school in Western Massachusetts.

Career
Clapp started writing at an early age and her writings were characterized by a high moral tone. Her first story, written when she was 20 years old, was a novel entitled Her Bright Future, drawn largely from life. Some 30,000 copies were sold. This was followed by a A Lucky Mishap and Mismated, which reached a sale of about 10,000 copies. A Woman's Triumph, and a serial first published in one of the Chicago dailies as "Tragedies of Prairie Life," and subsequently published in book form as a A Dark Secret followed. She wrote many short stories and sketches, and did considerable editorial work. "Her Bright Future" was a sermon on the evil of intemperance, while "Mismated" presents the errors in our social system which its title indicates.  
 
Her poems had a wide circulation. Clapp's poems appeared in the Chicago Current, the Interior, the Chicago Times, the Chicago Tribune, the Inter Ocean, the Boston Budget, and she wrote regularly for the Boston Transcript, and the Register, of Berlin, Germany. Her poems were compiled for publication in book form, under the title, Songs of Red Rose Land.

Clapp married Dr. C. B. Gibson of Chicago, in 1892, and spent a year in Europe, where she made a study of the literature of Germany and France. In 1900 she was writing for the New Bohemian magazine of Cincinnati which was trying to appeal to Bohemians in Ohio.

Her 1901 book Zauberlinda the Wise Witch is available as an audio book. She published this story under her second married name.

Personal life
On 30 December 1903 she was lucky to escape with just "bad burns" in the Iroquois Theatre fire that killed more than 600 people. The fire consumed the Iroquoi Theatre in Chicago. She had been sitting in the fifth row when there was a fire on stage and the safety curtain failed to fall and protect the audience. At least 602 were killed and the theatre was consumed. She died in 1916.

Selected works
 A Lucky Mishap: A Novel (1883)
 Her Bright Future: A Story of Today (1883)
 A Woman's Triumph: A True Story of Western Life (1885)
 A Dark Secret (1889)
 Zauberlinda, the Wise Witch (1901)
 The Women of Liege (1914)

References

Bibliography

External links
Eva Katherine Clapp Gibson at Wikisource
 

1857 births
1916 deaths
19th-century American writers
American women novelists
American women poets
American women short story writers
19th-century American women writers